Gareth Dobson (born ) is a former professional rugby league footballer who played in the 1990s and 2000s.

Club career
Gareth Dobson made his début for Castleford Tigers in the 32-20 victory over Huddersfield Giants on Sunday 20 September 1998, and played for Castleford Tigers in 1998's Super League III, 1999's Super League IV, and 2000's Super League V.

References

External links
Stanley Rangers ARLFC - Roll of Honour
Gareth Dobson Memory Box Search at archive.castigersheritage.com

1978 births
Living people
Castleford Tigers players
English rugby league players
Place of birth missing (living people)
Rugby league hookers
Rugby league locks
Sheffield Eagles players
York Wasps players